"Texas in 1880" is a song written by Radney Foster, and recorded by American country music duo Foster & Lloyd. It was released in April 1988 as the third single from the album Foster & Lloyd. The song reached #18 on the Billboard Hot Country Singles & Tracks chart.

In 2001, Foster covered it with Pat Green on the album Are You Ready for the Big Show? This version peaked at number 54 on the country charts.

Chart performance

Foster & Lloyd

Radney Foster with Pat Green

References

Songs about Texas
1988 singles
2001 singles
1987 songs
Foster & Lloyd songs
Songs written by Radney Foster
Radney Foster songs
Pat Green songs
Male vocal duets
RCA Records singles